| writer         = Pt. Mukhram SharmaRamayan Tiwari
| starring       = JeetendraLeena ChandavarkarMehmood
| music          = Laxmikant–Pyarelal
| cinematography = M.A. Rehman
| editing        = M.S. Money
| based_on       = Panakkara Kudumbam (1964)
| studio         = Tirupati Pictures
| distributor    = R.K. StudiosRajkamal StudiosVasu StudiosVauhini Studios
| released       = 
| runtime        = 154 minutes
| country        = India
| language       = Hindi
| budget         = 
}}

Humjoli is a 1970 Indian Hindi-language romantic drama film, produced by Prasan Kapoor under the Tirupati Pictures banner and directed by T. R. Ramanna. The film stars Jeetendra, Leena Chandavarkar, and is music composed by Laxmikant Pyarelal. It is a remake of the Tamil film Panakkara Kudumbam (1964).

Plot 
Gopal Das (Pran) is a vile greedy man who is in love with a girl Shyama (Shashikala). Once, he visits a wedding which is called off as the bride Roopa (Poornima) is dark. During that plight, Gopal Das marries Roopa, for her property. Later, he returns and assures Shyama that he will shortly discard Roopa and marry her. Time passes, and the couple is blessed with a baby girl Rani. Due to extortion, Shyama Gopal Das seeks to kill Roopa along with the baby. Fortuitously, the child is rescued which Gopal Das hides. Years roll by, and Gopal Das marries Shyama and secretly rears Rani (Leena Chadravakar). In college, she loves a smart guy Rajesh (Jeetendra) the brother of her close friend Shobha (Aruna Irani). After completion of their education, they all back to their hometowns. Gopal Das accommodates Rani separately and comforts her with a job as an unbeknownst. Meanwhile, Rajesh & Shobha quit the house since they oppose the remarriage of their father (D.K. Sapru). At that time, Rajesh befriends with a guy Shivram (Mehmood) who rents a portion of his house. Rajesh also acquires a job at Gopal Das’s office with the help of Rani. As an anecdote, Shivram falls for Shobha and they get married. Rajesh’s presence begrudges Man Mohan (Man Mohan) the distinct relative of Shyama one that keeps a bad eye on Rani. Man Mohan shadows Gopal Das and learns the reality. Hence, he threatens Gopal Das to knot with Rani by holding a letter that he wrote long ago regarding the evil plan to slay Roopa. So, he pleads with Rajesh to break up with Rani and he does so by creating himself as an imposter. Later, Gopal Das realizes Rajesh’s honesty, divulges the actuality to Rani, unites them, and surrenders to Police. Here, fortunately, Roopa is alive. Being aware of it, Man Mohan schemes to eliminate her when Shyama dies while guarding Roopa. At last, Rajesh rescues Roopa and acquits Gopal Das. Finally, the movie ends on a happy note with the marriage of Rajesh & Rani.

Cast 

Jeetendra as Rajesh
Leena Chandavarkar as Ranibala
Pran as Gopal Das
Shashikala as Shyama
Mehmood as Shivram, Balram and as Parshuram (triple role)
Aruna Irani as Shobha
Nazir Hussain as Roopa's dad
Manmohan as Manmohan
C.S. Dubey as Shyama's Uncle
D.K. Sapru	as Rajesh's dad
Purnima  as Roopa Rai
Geeta Banker as Lily
Mumtaz as Cabaret Dancer

Soundtrack

References

External links 
 

1970 films
1970s Hindi-language films
Films scored by Laxmikant–Pyarelal
Hindi remakes of Tamil films
Films directed by T. R. Ramanna